The 2008 Speedway Grand Prix of Italy was the tenth race of the 2008 Speedway Grand Prix season. It took place on September 27 in the Santa Marina Stadium in Lonigo, Italy. Italian SGP was won by Hans N. Andersen from Denmark. It was his first GP Won in this season.

Riders 

The Speedway Grand Prix Commission nominated Guglielmo Franchetti as a wild card, and Mattia Carpanese and Alessandro Milanese as track reserves. The draw was made on September 16 at the Fédération Internationale de Motocyclisme Headquarters in Mies, Switzerland.

Heat details

Heat by heat 

 Iversen, Kasprzak, Hancock, Carpanese Reserve rider Carpanese replaces injured Harris and comes.
 B.Pedersen, Jonsson, N.Pedersen, Lindgren (Fx)
 Crump, Gollob, Adams, Milanese, Nicholls (T/-) Nicholls touching the tapes and was excluded and replaced by Milanese.
 Andersen, Holta, Dryml, Franchetti
 Holta, Adams, Iversen, B.Pedersen
 Hancock, Gollob, Lindgren, Franchetti
 Nicholls, Dryml, Kasprzak, Jonsson
 Crump, Andersen, Carpanese, N.Pedersen (F2x) Pedersen crashes and is excluded. Carpanese takes a point despite broken chain.
 Andersen, Lindgren, Nicholls, Iversen
 Crump, B.Pedersen, Hancock, Dryml
 N.Pedersen, Kasprzak, Adams, Franchetti
 Jonsson, Holta, Gollob, Carpanese
 Jonsson, Crump, Iversen, Franchetti
 Hancock, Nicholls, Holta, N.Pedersen
 B.Pedersen, Andersen, Gollob, Kasprzak
 Adams, Lindgren, Dryml, Carpanese
 Gollob, N.Pedersen, Iversen, Dryml
 Adams, Andersen, Jonsson, Hancock
 Kasprzak, Crump, Holta, Lindgren
 B.Pedersen, Nicholls, Carpanese, Franchetti
 Semi-Finals:
 Crump, Adams, Holta, Gollob (X) Race stopped due to collision between Crump & Gollob - Gollob excluded
 Andersen, B.Pedersen, Hancock, Jonsson
 The Final:
 Andersen (6 points), B.Pedersen (4), Crump (2), Adams (0)

The intermediate classification

See also 
 Speedway Grand Prix
 List of Speedway Grand Prix riders

References

External links 
 www.SpeedwayWorld.tv

Italy
Speedway Grand Prix of Italy